Acción Galega (Galician Action in English language) is a Galician political organization led by former the former member of the PP Rafael Cuíña, former Galician autonomic Minister Teresa Táboas and the former senator of the Galician Nationalist Bloc (BNG) Xosé Manuel Perez Bouza. The party was founded in 2012 through the union of several parties of centrist and moderate Galician nationalist ideology: the Partido Galeguista Demócrata, the Galician Nationalist Party-Galicianist Party, Terra Galega and Galician Coalition.

Since its creation it is one of the founding organizations of Compromiso por Galicia (CxG). Terra Galega abandoned the organization on November 2012.

References

Political parties in Galicia (Spain)
Secessionist organizations in Europe
Galician nationalism
Socialism
Political parties established in 2012
2012 establishments in Spain